Pedro Henrique Ribeiro Gonçalves  (born 2 October 1995), known as Pedro Henrique, is a Brazilian professional footballer who plays as a centre back for Athletico Paranaense.

Career

Early life
Pedro began playing for Corinthians's academy in 2012. He was briefly loaned in 2013 for Flamengo-SP and played that year's Copa São Paulo de Futebol Júnior. During his tenure in Corinthians youth squads, he won the 2014 and 2015 U20 Campeonato Paulista, 2014 U20 Campeonato Brasileiro and the 2015 Copa São Paulo de Futebol Júnior.

Corinthians
Pedro was elevated to the professional team in February 2014, but did not take part in any of the season matches, only participating in training sessions and as an unused substitute. In January 2015, he made his debut entering during the half time in a friendly against 1. FC Köln at the team's pre-season in Florida, United States. He was eventually loaned to Bragantino for the 2015 Campeonato Brasileiro Série B, playing four games with the club before returning to Corinthians. He was part of the squad that won the 2015 Campeonato Brasileiro Série A.

His official debut for Corinthians took place on 4 June 2016 as the started in a comeback 2–1 victory against Coritiba at Arena Corinthians.

Athletico Paranaense 
On 21 July 2020, Pedro Henrique signed for Athletico Paranaense for a reported €1 million transfer fee. He signed a contract until the end of the 2024 season.

Career statistics

Honours
Corinthians
Campeonato Brasileiro Série A: 2015, 2017
Campeonato Paulista: 2017, 2018, 2019

Athletico Paranaense
J.League Cup / Copa Sudamericana Championship: 2019
Copa Sudamericana: 2021

References

External links
 

1995 births
Living people
Brazilian footballers
Sportspeople from Santa Catarina (state)
Association football defenders
Campeonato Brasileiro Série A players
Campeonato Brasileiro Série B players
Sport Club Corinthians Paulista players
Clube Atlético Bragantino players
Club Athletico Paranaense players
Brazil youth international footballers